is a side-scrolling beat 'em up arcade video game developed by Pallas and published internationally by SNK for both the Neo Geo MVS (arcade) and Neo Geo AES (home) platforms in 1991. It is based on Kazumasa Hirai's 1963 manga and anime superhero of the same name, who is considered one of the earliest cyborg superhero characters from Japan. Staying true to its concept of a crime-fighting super-robot, players take the role of 8 Man and his robo-comrade 9 Man respectively in a fight against an invading evil robot army.

Gameplay 

Eight Man is a side-scrolling beat 'em up game where players control the cyborg superhero 8 Man (P1) and his former rival comrade 9 Man (P2), across ten stages that take place in a futuristic setting where a bio-computer system called Cyber is threatening mankind with his army of robots. During gameplay, players can only move between left and right in the levels, while enemies are fought with either the A or C button (which activates the character's special attack), in addition of the B button that serves for jumping and pressing it when holding the joystick down, the characters perform a slide movement. The levels are broken into different phases and some of them involves the players chasing a vehicle, while enemies are coming out to attack. Power-ups are also scattered along the way to be collected that will enhance the player's attacks, as well as granting screen-clearing bombs that damages all enemies in sight. After reaching the end of a level, a boss must be fought in order to progress onto the next stage.

If a memory card is present, the player is allowed to save their progress and resume into the last stage the game saved at.

Release 
Eight Man was initially launched for arcades on June 7, 1991, and later during the same period for the Neo Geo AES in November 1991

Reception 

RePlay reported Eight Man to be the fourth most-popular arcade game at the time. Eight Man received mixed to positive reception since its initial release in arcades and Neo Geo AES.

Notes

References

External links 
 Eight Man at GameFAQs
 Eight Man at Giant Bomb
 Eight Man at Killer List of Videogames
 Eight Man at MobyGames

1991 video games
Arcade video games
SNK beat 'em ups
Cooperative video games
Multiplayer and single-player video games
Neo Geo games
Side-scrolling beat 'em ups
Superhero video games
Video games about cyborgs
Video games about police officers
Video games based on anime and manga
Video games set in the future
Video games developed in Japan